This is a list of yearly Pennsylvania State Athletic Conference football standings.

Pennsylvania State standings

References

Standings
Pennsylvania State Athletic Conference
College football-related lists